R. Malcolm Brown Jr. is an American biologist, currently the Johnson & Johnson Centennial Chair in Plant Cell Biology at University of Texas at Austin.

References

1939 births
Living people
21st-century American biologists
University of Texas at Austin faculty